Anwar Ul-Islam Girls' High School was founded as the Anwar ul-Islam Movement's post primary institution for girls. It operates at two levels: Junior and Senior school as Day and Boarding school.

History
It was founded on 4 October 1972 at Km 27, Abeokuta Expressway, Ojokoro, Nigeria. Signatories were Alhaji K.D. Oshodi and Mr. J.A. Gbadamosi. All the blocks of classrooms were inherited from Ahamadiyya Grade III Teacher's Training College, which closed down in 1996.

In a letter dated 19 February 1972, the Lagos State Government through the Ministry of Education approved the school called Ahmadiyya Girls' High School which was later change to Anwar ul-Islam Girls' High School. The school started with 72 students, four teaching staff, and the principal was Ms. M.A. Ketiku.

On October 2, 2001, the school was returned to the Anwar ul-Islam Movement of Nigeria due to the policy of the Lagos State Government headed by Governor Bola Ahmed Tinubu after several years of government control. After the school was returned to the movement, Mrs Akorede B.F. was posted as the principal.

Structure
The school operates at two levels: Junior and Senior school as Day and Boarding school. The lowest forms, JS I to JS III, make up the junior school. Students in those forms study for the Basic Education Certificate Examination (BECE) conducted by the Lagos State Examination Board and taken at the end of their third year. The Senior School Certificate Examination (SSCE) is the goal of the students in the upper forms.

Two examination bodies – West African Examinations Council (WAEC) and National Examinations Council (NECO) – are empowered to conduct separately the end-of-course examination. Students are to enter for both examinations.

Famous past pupils/students 
*ALHAJA SHAKIRAT ADEPEJU - FORMER CHAIRPERSON INSTITUTE OF CHARTERED ACCOUNTANTS, IKEJA BRANCH, LAGOS. 

Alhaja Bimbo Abina Lagos Business Tycoon 

Mrs. Deola Sode U.K. Based Neurosurgeon

Administration
The school is headed by the principal, who is assisted by vice principals. The principals of the school since inception are:
 Mrs. M.A. Ketiku              1972–1976
 Mrs. O.O. Sode                1976–1982
 Mrs. K.A. Giwa                1982–1989
 Mrs. S.A. Ajao                1989–1990
 Alhaja T.M. Akinwande         1990–2001
 Mrs. B.F Akorede              2001–2008
 Mrs. F.S. Afolabi             2008–2013
 Mrs. A. Shobowale             2013–2014
 Mrs. B.A. Ndukw               2014–2016
 Mrs. Salau O.F.               2016–2017
 Mrs Balogun S.A               2017–present

Girls' schools in Lagos
Educational institutions established in 1972
1972 establishments in Nigeria